After the Fall is a two-disc live album by American jazz pianist Keith Jarrett recorded with bassist Gary Peacock and drummer Jack DeJohnette. The album was recorded on November 14, 1998, at New Jersey Performing Arts Center but released only in 2018.

Chris Pearson of The Times stated "The title refers to Keith Jarrett’s 'fall' into a bout of chronic fatigue syndrome in autumn (or fall) 1996. As the American pianist explains in his sleeve notes, the illness kept him from playing publicly for two years. This concert, recorded near his home in New Jersey, was his first post-recovery attempt to play before an audience. It’s a caveat of sorts, as is its casual capture through the venue’s mixing console. Yet the tape and the trio sound fine."

Reception 
Thom Jurek of Allmusic wrote "This double disc isn't merely a compelling historical document, it is an exemplary concert full of inspired readings of classic jazz tunes ranging from the Great American Songbook through bebop and John Coltrane."

Track listing

Personnel 
Band
 Keith Jarrett – piano
 Gary Peacock – double bass
 Jack DeJohnette – drums

Production
 Keith Jarrett – producer, liner notes
 Manfred Eicher – executive producer
 Alain Leduc – recording
 Bernd Kuchenbeiser – design 
 Patrick Hinely – photography
 Roberto Masotti – photography

Charts

References 

2018 live albums
Keith Jarrett live albums
ECM Records live albums